Kallukkul Eeram is a 1980 Indian Tamil-language film, directed by P. S. Nivas, starring Bharathiraja, Sudhakar, Aruna and Vijayashanti. This film marked the cinematic debut for both Aruna and Vijayashanti.

Plot 
This is  a story of two innocent village girls who fall in love with the Director and Hero of a cinema crew visiting their village for a shoot. Aruna falls  in love with Bharathiraja and Vijayashanthi with Sudhakar.

Bharathiraja's movie crew lands on the picturesque and primeval village. The villagers are enthralled by the visiting crew. Vijaya Shanthi, a witty girl and Aruna, who perpetually wears an expression of shock and surprise combined, her marble-eyes not letting any other emotions through, are constant on lookers. Aruna steps into the frame of the movie and is admonished by Bharathiraja. Vijayshanthi and Aruna stage a role play song with the village children, with V. Shanthi as the heroine and Aruna as the director. Bharathiraja and Sudhakar walk by and catch them in the act. They appreciate the villagers amateur attempt and praise them. Aruna returns some money she finds, which belongs to Bharathiraja and he further appreciates her honesty.

Goundamani, who is Aruna's dad, runs the village laundry. Aruna delivers the laundered clothes to the crew. As she visits Bharathiraja each time, she also secretly sends him a flower or a note.

Vijayashanthi develops romantic feelings towards Sudhakar, only to be told by him that he meets several girls like her and she mistook his friendly gestures. In a moment when a supporting artiste did not show up, Bharathiraja grabs Aruna from the crowd and makes her play a one line part.

Karuppan, who wounded the arm of another villager who once teased Aruna, returns from jail. He finds out about Bharathiraja grabbing Aruna's arm and tries to kill him by rolling rocks on him. However, Aruna finds out and saves Bharathiraja. He notices later that the cloth tied around his injured arm belongs to Aruna's saree. During the village temple festival, Vijayashanthi dances in the play. However, as she was jilted by Sudhakar, she commits suicide. Karuppan tries to molest Aruna in the groves, but Chandrashekar, the village madman kills him.

The crew leaves the village. As they leave, Aruna stops Bharathiraja, but doesn't tell him anything. Hounded by memories of her, he returns and they unite on the river banks. As he holds her hand, Chandrashekar kills him from behind.

Cast 

Bharathiraja as himself
Sudhakar as himself
Aruna as Solai
Vijayashanti as Kaathi
Vennira Aadai Nirmala as Nirmala
Goundamani as Velu
Manivannan as  Assistant director
Janagaraj
Manobala
Ramanathan
Senadhipathi
Chandrasekhar
Krishnamoorthy
Ambalavaanan

Soundtrack 
The music was composed by Ilaiyaraaja.

References

External links 

1980 films
1980s Tamil-language films
Films scored by Ilaiyaraaja